Callawapore was a type of calico manufactured in Madras, India. It was produced in blue and white colors. Piece goods of various qualities and dimensions were produced in and around Madras. Callawapore was one of the materials exported to England in the nineteenth century.

See also 

 Punjum
 Salampore

References 

Woven fabrics
Textile arts of India